Brean Down Fort was a Victorian naval fortification designed to protect the Bristol Channel.

The site has a long history because of its prominent position. The earliest recorded settlement is from the Early to Middle Bronze Age.

The current buildings were constructed in the 1860s as one of the Palmerston Forts to provide protection to the ports of the Bristol Channel, and was decommissioned in 1901. During World War II it was rearmed and used for experimental weapons testing.

The site has been owned by the National Trust since 2002, following a £431,000 renovation project, as part of its Brean Down property and is open to the public.

The fort was used as a location for filming of the second episode, "Warriors", of the BBC television drama Bonekickers.

The fort was also used for exterior scenes of the Royal Marines attack on the villains base on Cragfest Island in episode six of 1978 HTV series The Doombolt Chase.

Bronze Age to Roman
The earliest record settlement is from the Early to Middle Bronze Age. It is now on an exposed cliff as the land has been eroded by the sea. Bronze Age artefacts from the site include pottery and jewellery. Most of the finds are now in the Museum of Somerset in Taunton. The presence of a probable roundhouse has also been detected.

The site has also produced Roman gold and silver coins of the emperors Augustus, Nero, Drusus and Vespasian and a cornelian ring.

Palmerston Fort
Brean Down Fort forms part of a line of defences, known as Palmerston Forts, built across the channel to protect the approaches to Bristol and Cardiff. It was fortified following a visit by Queen Victoria and Prince Albert to France, where they had been concerned at the strength of the French Navy. The Royal Commission on the Defence of the United Kingdom, under direction of Lord Palmerston, recommended fortification of the coast. Brean Down Fort formed part of a strategic coastal defence system covering the channel between the mainland and the islands of Steep Holm and Flat Holm.

Four acres of land at the end of Brean Down were requisitioned in 1862, with construction beginning in 1864 and completed in 1871.

The fort was originally armed with seven  rifled muzzle-loading guns, which were among the last of this type to be made at the Woolwich Gun Foundry. These sited at three main gun positions, including W battery containing two guns on 'C' pivots (rotating around a reused Georgian cannon set upright in the ground). It was proposed to replace the  guns with larger  versions in 1888 but this was never put into action. The fort was staffed by 50 officers and men of the Coast Brigade, Royal Artillery, but no shots were ever fired in action.

The end of the fort's active service came at 5 a.m. on 6 July 1900 when the No. 3 magazine which held 3 tons (3 tonnes) of gunpowder exploded. An inquiry found that Gunner Haines had fired a ball cartridge down a ventilator shaft causing the explosion, after being put on a charge for returning late to barracks, however this explanation has been challenged. No one knew why the gunner had blown up the fort, but it has been speculated that it was an act of suicide. The cannons were hauled away by traction engines.

It was then used as a café, owned by the Hillman family from at least 1907 until sold in 1936 to the 'bird sanctuary people'.

World War II
On the outbreak of World War II the fort was rearmed with two six-inch ex-naval guns and two searchlights as a Coastal artillery battery. The site was also used as a test launch site for rockets and experimental weapons.

Two gun positions were built to mount the ex-naval guns in their turrets. These were later protected with a "plastic" anti-aircraft roof. One position was built over the ruins of the old west battery and the other partly obscures the north west battery. The barrack blocks were converted and the windows partly blocked to reduce the effects of blast. Several other associated structures, including searchlight batteries for illuminating seaborne targets, a command post and the barracks for the garrison were built outside the original Palmeston fort.

The site was manned by 365 and 366 Coast Batteries of 571st Coast Regiment, Royal Artillery, formed from Brean Down Fire Control in December 1941 and disbanded in April 1944.

Several experimental weapons were trialled at Brean, by the Admiralty's Directorate of Miscellaneous Weapons Development, based at HMS Birnbeck. The only evidence being a short length of launching rail, designed to launch a bouncing bomb.

Some of the better known weapons trialled were the seaborne Bouncing bomb designed specifically to bounce to a target such as across water to avoid torpedo nets, anti-submarine missile AMUCK and the expendable acoustic emitter (designed to confuse noise-seeking torpedoes).

Gallery

See also
List of hillforts and ancient settlements in Somerset

References
 Notes

 Sources

 van der Bijl, Nicholas (2000). Brean Down Fort: Its History and the Defence of the Bristol Channel. Cossington: Hawk Editions. .

Further reading
 Brown, Donald (1999). Somerset V Hitler: Secret Operations in the Mendips 1939–1945. Newbury: Countryside Books. .

External links

 Victorian Forts data sheet
 information at the National Trust
 Palmerston Forts
 Brean Down Fort Visitor Information

Forts in Somerset
Palmerston Forts
National Trust properties in Somerset
Hill forts in Somerset
Scheduled monuments in Sedgemoor
History of Somerset
Iron Age sites in Somerset
Coastal artillery